Ettiley Heath is a village in the civil parish of Sandbach which is in the unitary authority of Cheshire East and the ceremonial county of Cheshire, England. The Sandbach ward is called Ettiley Heath and Wheelock. The population of this ward at the 2011 Census was 4,409. It is west of Sandbach.

Constituencies

Ettiley Heath is in the Congleton constituency; the MP has been Fiona Bruce since 2010. Prior to Brexit in 2020 it was part of the North West Constituency for the European Parliament.

Notes and references

Notes

Bibliography

External links

Villages in Cheshire